Twin Dragons (also known as Shuang long hui and Brother vs. Brother) is a 1992 Hong Kong action comedy film directed by Ringo Lam and Tsui Hark, and starring Jackie Chan in a double role as identical twin brothers separated at birth.

Plot
In 1965, a Hong Kong couple (Sylvia Chang and James Wong) are doting on their newborn identical twin boys. Meanwhile, a dangerous gang leader named Crazy Kung (Kirk Wong) is being transported as a captive in the same hospital. Crazy Kung escapes and attempts to take one of the twins hostage, and in the ensuing chaos the twins are permanently separated. One of the twins, named Ma Yau, is taken to America by his parents and grows up to be a concert pianist and conductor. The other twin, Ma Wan, is found and raised by an alcoholic woman named Tsui (Mabel Cheung), and becomes a street racer and martial artist named Bok Min. For years, neither of them is aware that he has an identical twin brother.

26 years later, the twins' (Jackie Chan) lives intersect again: Bok Min and his best friend Tarzan (Teddy Robin) get mixed up with a dangerous gang, while Ma Yau prepares to conduct a major concert in Hong Kong. In addition, the twins gain romantic interests: Bok Min meets Barbara (Maggie Cheung), a club singer Tarzan is interested in, and Yau becomes acquainted with Tong Sum (Nina Li Chi), a young woman from a respectable family who has a secret passion for fighter types. Eventually, the twins meet and discover that they share a strange connection with each other. As a result, a string of comedic mix-ups ensues when Ma Yau is accidentally enlisted by the gangsters to participate as an escape driver in the liberation of none other than Crazy Kung; Bok Min in turn is forced to conduct Yau's concert (which becomes a smash hit despite him having absolutely no musical talent); and the two of them end up with the other's girl as their respective love interest.

Eventually, things come to a head when the gangsters kidnap Tarzan to make Ma Yau surrender a briefcase meant for Crazy Kung, which Ma Yau had accidentally nabbed. The twins join up to defeat the gang that has turned their lives upside down, and in a showdown in a vehicle testing center Crazy Kung dies in a runaway crash test car. The film ends with the impending double wedding of the twins to their girls and Bok Min's introduction to his real parents; but when Bok Min gets cold feet and Ma Yau goes looking for him, a final gag falls into place when the wedding guests catch the two twins together and are unable to tell them apart.

Cast
 Jackie Chan as Ma Yau / Bok Min (John Ma / Boomer in the American release)
 Maggie Cheung as Barbara
 Nina Li Chi as Tong Sum (Tammy in the American release)
Teddy Robin as Tarzan (Tyson in the American release)
 Anthony Chan as hotel staffer
 Philip Chan as hotel manager Chen
 Sylvia Chang as the twins' mother
 James Wong as the twins' father
 Alfred Cheung as Boss Wing
 Jacob Cheung as cafe cashier
 Cheung Tung-jo as orchestra member
 John Keung as hotel security officer
 Chor Yuen as Uncle Tang (Tammy's father)
 Lau Kar-leung as doctor
 Kirk Wong as Crazy Kung
 Wong Lung-wai as Wai
 Lai Ying-chow as Tsao
 Jamie Luk as Rocky
 John Woo as priest
 Tsui Siu-ming as priest
 Eric Tsang as man talking on the phone (Man on Phone in the American release)
 David Wu as waiter
 Pa Shan as thug
 Ringo Lam as car mechanic
 Ng Sze-yuen as car mechanic
 Tsui Hark as car mechanic
 Clifton Ko as sports shop owner
 Tai Kit Mak

Production
According to co-director Tsui Hark, Ringo Lam handled most of the action scenes in the film. The action in the film has a larger focus on actual martial arts than on Jackie Chan's usual comedic style.

Music
Ma Yau's Concert depicted in the movie is the Ruslan and Lyudmila Overture, by Mikhail Glinka.

Release
The film received an American release on 9 April 1999 in a dubbed version. The American release of the film cuts 16 minutes of scenes involving Wong Jing and Lau Kar-leung in a hospital and a fantasy scene involving Maggie Cheung singing.

Reception

Box office
On the film's release in Hong Kong, Twin Dragons was the ninth highest-grossing film of the year, earning 33,225,134 during its theatrical run. In Taiwan, it was the twelfth top-grossing film of 1992, earning . In Japan, the film grossed . In South Korea, it was the third top-grossing film of 1992, selling 768,951 tickets and grossing .

Upon release in North America, the film grossed US$8,332,431 in the United States, ending its North American run with a total of US$8,359,717 in the United States and Canada. In total, the film grossed  worldwide, equivalent to US$86,265,362 adjusted for inflation.

Critical response
At Metacritic, which assigns a normalized rating out of 100 to reviews from mainstream critics, the film has received an average score of 54, based on 15 reviews. The Austin Chronicle gave the film a positive review of three and a half stars out of five, noting that the film is "only for those who are fully on the bus with Jackie's approach...and who won't let a little bad (okay, execrable) English-language dubbing get in the way of their movie enjoyment." The A.V. Club gave a positive review, but noted that it "probably won't make anyone forget Dragons Forever, Wheels On Meals, Project A, or any number of other excellent Chan films" Some reviews critiqued the special effects, such as in Variety which noted "the camera trickery is glaringly cheesy in some shots, greatly undercutting the illusion of twin brothers in the same frame. When the two brothers first meet in a hotel lavatory, it's easy to see how two shots have been overlapped." TV Guide gave the film one star out of four, noting that it  "suffers from some very dicey twinning effects when the brothers are in frame together. Only die-hard and undemanding Chan fans need apply." Jackie Chan was unhappy with how Twin Dragons came out to be primarily based on the special effects. Chan stated that he worked with Tsui Hark who he felt would provide the film with better special effects. Chan was so soured with the results of the special effects that he decided he would only attempt more special-effect based work in his American productions.

Remakes
The film spawned several Indian film remakes. Hello Brother (1994) is a popular Telugu film based on Twin Dragons. In turn, Hello Brother was remade into the popular Hindi film Judwaa (1997) starring Salman Khan, which in turn spawned a reboot Judwaa 2 (2017). Hello Brother was also remade as the Kannada film Cheluva (1997).

See also

 Hong Kong films of 1992
 Jackie Chan filmography
 List of action films of the 1990s
 List of comedy films of the 1990s

Notes

References

External links
 
 
 Twin Dragons at Metacritic
 
 

1992 films
1992 martial arts films
1992 action comedy films
1990s buddy comedy films
1990s Cantonese-language films
Films about twin brothers
Films directed by Ringo Lam
Films directed by Tsui Hark
Films scored by Michael Wandmacher
Films set in Hong Kong
Golden Harvest films
Hong Kong action comedy films
Hong Kong buddy films
Hong Kong martial arts comedy films
1990s Hong Kong films